Chocianów  is a town in Polkowice County, Lower Silesian Voivodeship, in south-western Poland. It is the seat of the administrative district (gmina) called Gmina Chocianów. As of December 2021, it has a population of 7,869.

History
The area, along with Lower Silesia, was part of Poland since the establishment of the state in the 10th century. As a result of the fragmentation of Poland, by the end of the 13th century the area was part of the Polish Duchy of Świdnica, ruled by a local branch of the Piast dynasty. The settlement developed from a castle called Chodzenow built in 1297 by Duke Bolko I the Strict of Świdnica, who had to secure his lands against the claims of Wenceslaus II of Bohemia.

From 1742 Chocianów was part of Prussia and from 1871 to 1945 it was part of Germany, known by its Germanized name of Kotzenau. It received its town privileges in 1894. The town had a population of 4,301 in 1939, but with war deaths and the expulsion of most Germans after the war the population was down to 1,707 in 1946. After Nazi Germany's defeat in World War II the town became again part of Poland.

Demographics

Detailed data as of 31 December 2021:

Number of inhabitants by year

Gallery

References

Cities and towns in Lower Silesian Voivodeship
Polkowice County
Cities in Silesia